Owen Simpson (born 18 December 1943 in Mickley, England) is an  English former professional footballer. He played for Rotherham, Leyton Orient, Colchester, Southend, Darlington and Grimsby in The Football League

References

External links 
 Owen Simpson at Colchester United Archive Database
 

1943 births
Living people
Rotherham United F.C. players
Leyton Orient F.C. players
Colchester United F.C. players
Southend United F.C. players
Darlington F.C. players
Grimsby Town F.C. players
Boston United F.C. players
Association football defenders
English footballers
People from Mickley, Northumberland
Footballers from Northumberland